The Greatest Story Ever Told—So Far: Why Are We Here? is the tenth full-length non-fiction book by the American theoretical physicist Lawrence M. Krauss. The book was initially published on March 21, 2017 by Atria Books.

Synopsis
The book deals with the current scientific understanding of the creation of the Universe and gives a history of how scientists have formulated the Standard Model of Particle Physics. Krauss also details how symmetries have blazed the path for the major breakthroughs of modern particle physics.

Reception
A reviewer of Publishers Weekly stated: "In confident and verbose prose, Krauss tells a story that both celebrates and explores science. Through it, he reminds readers why scientists build such complicated machinery and push the boundaries of the quantum world when nothing makes sense: “For no more practical reason than to celebrate and explore the beauty of nature." David Warmflash of Wired UK commented "Author Lawrence Krauss' upcoming book is all about the history of physics and modern research, encompassing both cosmology and subatomic physics; what Krauss describes as particle astrophysics. It’s a science book. And yet, most of the chapters open with a biblical quote."

References

External links

Popular physics books
2017 non-fiction books
Books by Lawrence M. Krauss
Atria Publishing Group books